The women's 800 metre freestyle event at the 2000 Summer Olympics took place on 21–22 September at the Sydney International Aquatic Centre in Sydney, Australia.

United States' teenager Brooke Bennett became the second swimmer in Olympic history to defend her title in the event, and the fifth to strike a long-distance freestyle double, since Debbie Meyer did so in 1968, Petra Thümer in 1976, Tiffany Cohen in 1984, and the legendary Janet Evans in 1988. She maintained a powerful lead from start to finish before hitting the wall first in 8:19.67, the second-fastest of all time, cutting off Evans' 12-year Olympic record by 0.53 seconds. After effortlessly striking a medley double over the past six days, Yana Klochkova added a silver to her medal tally at these Games, in a scintillating Ukrainian record of 8:22.66. Bennett's teammate Kaitlin Sandeno gave the Americans a further reason to celebrate, as she powered home with a bronze in 8:24.29.

Switzerland's Flavia Rigamonti lost a spirited challenge to Sandeno for the bronze by more than a full body length, but earned a fourth spot in a national record of 8:25.91. She was followed in fifth by Germany's Hannah Stockbauer (8:30.11), and in sixth by China's Chen Hua (8:30.58). Stockbauer's teammate Jana Henke (8:31.97), bronze medalist in Barcelona eight years earlier, and Japan's Sachiko Yamada (8:37.39) rounded out the finale.

Records
Prior to this competition, the existing world and Olympic records were as follows.

The following new world and Olympic records were set during this competition.

Results

Heats

Final

References

External links
Official Olympic Report

F
2000 in women's swimming
Women's events at the 2000 Summer Olympics